Jerković or Jerkovic is a surname. Notable people with the surname include:

Dražan Jerković (1936–2008), Croatian and Yugoslav football forward, and manager
Goran Jerković (born 1965), footballer
Goran Jerković (born 1986), footballer
Ivan Jerković (born 1979), footballer
Ivona Jerković (born 1984), Serbian female basketball player
Jurica Jerković (1950–2019), former Croatian footballer
Katherine Jerkovic, Canadian film director
Vedran Jerković (born 1991), footballer

See also
Braće Jerković an urban neighborhood of Belgrade, the capital of Serbia

Croatian surnames
Serbian surnames